SCORE Class 5-1600 is open wheel limited Baja Bug class that competes in the SCORE off-road race series races including the Baja 1000, Baja 500, Baja Sur 500, San Felipe 250, and the SCORE Desert Challenge.

Vehicle description
Vehicle must be a VW Sedan Type 1 Hardtop or sunroof as delivered from the factory.  Vehicle must have the external appearance of a "Baja Bug".
 
No Convertibles, Super Beetles, 181 Safari, Porsche 900 series, or Karmann Ghia are included in this class.

Class requirements

Engine
Engine must utilize Volkswagen series type 1, 1600cc, US model sedan components and dimensions.  Displacement is limited to 1600cc.

Suspension
Front suspension must be either Volkswagen Type 1, 181 ball joint or link pin only. Rear suspension is based on Volkswagen Type 1 independent rear suspension or swing axle.

Body
Vehicles must have an external appearance of a Baja Bug.  Original wheelbase must be maintained.

Notable race teams
 Vikingos
 Yolo Racing - Erich Reisen, Ross Burden, Ted Balkie
 GONZO RACING Trevor Anderson, Mark Anderson
BASECAMP OFF-ROAD    Matt Barnes, Todd Baxter, John Bosch, Trevor Anderson, Brian Schrom, Andy May

Crouchenvironmental.com - Greg Crouch, Kay Crouch, with Racer Services (Paul Mischel).
 Borrachos Motorsports - Hector Hurtado, Sergio Lopez, Fernando Flores, Omar Vega, Fernando Sanchez, Oscar Fregoso

References

SCORE International (2011). "2011-2015 Off-Road Racing Rules and Regulations".
SCORE International. " 2009 New Classes & Existing Class Rule Amendments"

External links
Official SCORE International website